Bryce Hegarty (born 28 August 1992) is an Australian rugby union player who plays either as a fly-half or fullback. He currently plays for Western Force in Super Rugby. He previously played for the Queensland Reds, the Melbourne Rebels and the New South Wales Waratahs in Super Rugby, Toyota Industries Shuttles in Japan, and Leicester Tigers in England's Premiership Rugby.

Hegarty is the son of former Manly Sea Eagles player Steve Hegarty.

Professional career 
Hegarty played for the Brisbane Broncos Under-20 side before moving south to Melbourne ahead of the 2013 Super Rugby season. The following week he made his first start, against the Stormers at fly-half in the absence of the injured James O'Connor and Angus Roberts.

After the 2015 Super Rugby season, Hegarty joined Japanese Top League side Toyota Industries Shuttles for the 2015–16 season. He returned to Australia to play for the Waratahs in 2016.

On 21 June 2021 Hegarty moved to Leicester Tigers in England's Premiership Rugby. On 30 October 2021, he made his debut for Leicester after appearing as a substitute in the East Midlands Derby against Northampton Saints.  Hegarty left Leicester on 13 November 2022 after making 15 appearances for the club.

References

External links 
Melbourne Rebels Profile

1992 births
Living people
Australian expatriate rugby union players
Australian expatriate sportspeople in Japan
Australian rugby league players
Australian rugby union players
Black Rams Tokyo players
Brisbane City (rugby union) players
Melbourne Rebels players
Norths Devils players
Rugby league fullbacks
Rugby league five-eighths
Rugby league halfbacks
Rugby league players from Brisbane
Rugby union fullbacks
Rugby union fly-halves
Rugby union players from Brisbane
Expatriate rugby union players in Japan
New South Wales Waratahs
Queensland Reds players
Sydney (NRC team) players
Expatriate rugby league players in England
Leicester Tigers players
Toyota Industries Shuttles Aichi players
Western Force players